O-1125 (3-(1,1-dimethylhexyl-6-dimethylcarboxamide)-Δ8-tetrahydrocannabinol) is a research chemical which is a cannabinoid derivative. It has analgesic effects and is used in scientific research. It is a potent CB1 full agonist with a Ki of 1.16 nM.

References

Cannabinoids
Benzochromenes
Phenols
Carboxamides